The 1970 European Weightlifting Championships were held in Szombathely, Hungary from June 20 to June 28, 1970. This was the 49th edition of the event. There were 137 men in action from 21 nations.

Medal summary
{| 
|-
!colspan=7|52 kg
|-
|Press
| || 112.5 kg
| || 110.0 kg
| || 105.0 kg
|-
|Snatch
| || 100.0 kg
| || 97.5 kg
| || 92.5 kg
|-
|Clean & Jerk
| || 130.0 kg
| || 125.0 kg
| || 125.0 kg
|-bgcolor=#dfefff
|Total
| || 340.0 kg| || 327.5 kg
| || 325.0 kg|-
!colspan=7|56 kg
|-
|Press
| || 127.5 kg
| || 112.5 kg
| || 112.5 kg
|-
|Snatch
| || 110.0 kg
| || 107.5 kg
| || 107.5 kg
|-
|Clean & Jerk
| || 142.5 kg
| || 140.0 kg
| || 135.0 kg
|-bgcolor=#dfefff
|Total| || 372.5 kg
| || 362.5 kg| || 352.5 kg
|-
!colspan=7|60 kg
|-
|Press
| || 132.5 kg
| || 120.0 kg
| || 120.0 kg
|-
|Snatch
| || 120.0 kg
| || 115.0 kg
| || 107.5 kg
|-
|Clean & Jerk
| || 145.0 kg
| || 142.5 kg
| || 142.5 kg
|-bgcolor=#dfefff
|Total
| || 382.5 kg| || 377.5 kg
| || 375.0 kg|-
!colspan=7|67.5 kg
|-
|Press
| || 140.0 kg
| || 140.0 kg
| || 140.0 kg
|-
|Snatch
| || 130.0 kg
| || 130.0 kg
| || 125.0 kg
|-
|Clean & Jerk
| || 167.5 kg
| || 165.0 kg
| || 162.5 kg
|-bgcolor=#dfefff
|Total| || 432.5 kg
| || 432.5 kg| || 427.5 kg
|-
!colspan=7|75 kg
|-
|Press
| || 152.5 kg
| || 150.0 kg
| || 145.0 kg
|-
|Snatch
| || 137.5 kg
| || 135.0 kg
| || 135.0 kg
|-
|Clean & Jerk
| || 177.5 kg
| || 175.0 kg
| || 165.0 kg
|-bgcolor=#dfefff
|Total
| || 465.0 kg| || 452.5 kg
| || 445.0 kg|-
!colspan=7|82.5 kg
|-
|Press
| || 162.5 kg
| || 162.5 kg
| || 157.5 kg
|-
|Snatch
| || 147.5 kg
| || 140.0 kg
| || 140.0 kg
|-
|Clean & Jerk
| || 185.0 kg
| || 185.0 kg
| || 182.5 kg
|-bgcolor=#dfefff
|Total| || 487.5 kg
| || 472.5 kg| || 465.0 kg
|-
!colspan=7|90 kg
|-
|Press
| || 177.5 kg
| || 177.5 kg
| || 177.5 kg
|-
|Snatch
| || 160.0 kg
| || 157.5 kg
| || 157.5 kg
|-
|Clean & Jerk
| || 200.0 kg
| || 192.5 kg
| || 192.5 kg
|-bgcolor=#dfefff
|Total
| || 530.0 kg| || 527.5 kg
| || 525.0 kg|-
!colspan=7|110 kg
|-
|Press
| || 195.0 kg
| || 180.0 kg
| || 180.0 kg
|-
|Snatch
| || 160.0 kg
| || 155.0 kg
| || 152.5 kg
|-
|Clean & Jerk
| || 215.0 kgWR| || 195.0 kg
| || 192.5 kg
|-bgcolor=#dfefff
|Total| || 562.5 kgWR
| || 525.0 kg| || 517.5 kg
|-
!colspan=7|+110 kg
|-
|Press
| || 217.5 kgWR
| || 192.5 kg
| || 192.5 kg
|-
|Snatch
| || 172.5 kg
| || 170.0 kg
| || 162.5 kg
|-
|Clean & Jerk
| || 225.0 kgWR
| || 212.5 kg
| || 210.0 kg
|-bgcolor=#dfefff
|Total
| || 612.5 kgWR| || 577.5 kg
| || 565.0 kg|}

Medal table
Ranking by Big''' (Total result) medals

References
Results (Chidlovski.net)
М. Л. Аптекарь. «Тяжёлая атлетика. Справочник.» — М.: «Физкультура и спорт», 1983. — 416 с. 

European Weightlifting Championships
European Weightlifting Championships
European Weightlifting Championships
International weightlifting competitions hosted by Hungary
Sport in Szombathely